Külüg Bilge Qaghan — 5th leader of Uyghur Khaganate. His Tang invested title was Zhongzhen Qaghan (忠貞可汗). He was born around 772/773.

Reign 
He was a minor when his father died. He was known as Panguan Tegin (泮官特勒), when raised to throne after his father's death. His reign was very brief - 5 months.

Death 
There are two different versions regarding his circumstance of death. According to one account he was killed by his brother, who for a time usurped the throne. Another account suggested that Külüg Qaghan was poisoned by a khatun -  E (葉), who happened to be a granddaughter of Pugu Huai'en. His throne was usurped by his brother, however he too was killed by nobles who in turn raised his minor son Achuo (阿啜) to the throne.

His death happened just before Uyghurs suffered a heavy defeat under Grand Chancellor Inanchu Bilge (頡千逝斯) of Elter (𨁂跌) against Tibetans who were aided by Karluk Yabgu State ruler Alp Burguchan who united Chigils, Bulaqs and Shatuo, near Beshbaliq. As the result Yang Xigu (楊襲古) Commander of Beiting Protectorate committed suicide.

References 

770s births
790 deaths
8th-century Turkic people
8th-century monarchs in Asia
8th-century murdered monarchs
Yaglakar clan
Tengrist monarchs
Child monarchs from Asia
Deaths by poisoning